Usmanovo (Uśman) is a rural locality (a village) in Norkinsky Selsoviet, Baltachevsky District, Bashkortostan, Russia. The population was 151 as of 2010. There are 5 streets.

Geography 
Usmanovo is located 15 km southwest of Starobaltachevo (the district's administrative centre) by road. Norkino is the nearest rural locality.

References 

Rural localities in Baltachevsky District